Dinesh Lamba is an Indian actor mainly acting in Bollywood. He is primarily seen in supporting roles and has appeared in over 60 Hindi and Tamil films and several television commercials.

Filmography

References

External links 
 

Indian male film actors
Living people
People from Gujarat
Sainik School alumni
Year of birth missing (living people)